The following is a list of people associated with the University of Tennessee system in all its campuses. The list does not include personnel associated with Oak Ridge National Laboratory.

Politics and law

Education

Actors, directors, and entertainers

Artists and musicians

Authors

Business and economy

Military

Athletics and sportscasters

Journalists and newscasters
 Richard Ernsberger, Jr., senior editor, Newsweek
 Huell Howser, California television personality
 Ann Taylor, NPR newscaster
 Gene Wojciechowski, ESPN writer and commentator
 Ryan McGee, ESPN writer and commentator

Rhodes Scholars

Nobel laureates
 James Buchanan, winner of the 1986 Nobel Prize in Economic Science; received an M.S. degree from UT in 1941
 Peter C. Doherty, faculty member in the UT Health Science Center in Memphis

Pulitzer prize winners

Science and technology

Astronauts

Faculty 
 Charles W. Kent (1860-1917), English scholar
 Vernon Lattin (born 1938), president of Brooklyn College
 Jill Mikucki, microbiologist, Antarctic researcher
 Kate Vitasek, author and educator, adjunct faculty in the Haslam College of Business Global Supply Chain Institute and the Graduate and Executive Education

References

External links
 University of Tennessee distinguished alumni

Lists of people by university or college in Tennessee